Hammer Creek Bridge may refer to the following bridges on the National Register of Historic Places in Lancaster County, Pennsylvania:
Erb's Covered Bridge on Erbs Bridge Road
Brunnerville Road Bridge over Hammer Creek